Philipp Kohlschreiber was the defending champion, but withdrew in the quarterfinals due to a shoulder injury.

In the final, Juan Martín del Potro defeated Sam Querrey, 6–4, 6–4.

Seeds

Draw

Finals

Top half

Bottom half

Qualifying

Seeds

Qualifiers

Draw

First qualifier

Second qualifier

Third qualifier

Fourth qualifier

References

External links
 Draw
 Qualifying draw

Singles